Archiargiolestes pusillus is a species of Australian damselfly in the family Megapodagrionidae,
commonly known as a little flatwing. 
It is endemic to south-western Australia, where it inhabits streams, bogs and swamps.

Archiargiolestes pusillus is a small damselfly, black metallic in colour with pale markings. It rests with its wings outspread.

Gallery

See also
 List of Odonata species of Australia

References 

Megapodagrionidae
Odonata of Australia
Insects of Australia
Endemic fauna of Australia
Taxa named by Robert John Tillyard
Insects described in 1908
Damselflies